Brackenridgea palustris is a tree in the family Ochnaceae. The specific epithet  is from the Latin meaning "swampy", referring to the species' habitat.

Description
The smooth to scaly bark is brown to reddish brown.

Distribution and habitat
Brackenridgea palustris grows naturally in Sumatra, Peninsular Malaysia, Singapore, Borneo, the Philippines and Sulawesi. Its habitat is lowland forests, especially peat swamp and kerangas, to submontane forests, from sea-level to  altitude.

References

Ochnaceae
Trees of Malesia
Flora of the Borneo lowland rain forests
Flora of the Sundaland heath forests
Plants described in 1901
Taxonomy articles created by Polbot